Nefedyevo is a rural locality (a village) in Tolshmenskoye Rural Settlement, Totemsky District, Vologda Oblast, Russia. The population was 2 as of 2002.

Geography 
Nefedyevo is located 93 km south of Totma (the district's administrative centre) by road. Selo is the nearest rural locality.

References 

Rural localities in Tarnogsky District